Zbigniew Bzymek (born January 21, 1976) is a filmmaker, experimental theatre and music video artist who lives and works in New York City. He is best known for his film Utopians, which premiered at The 61st Berlin International Film Festival and for winning the Grand Prix at the 31st Rencontres Henri Langlois. He has been called "a young filmmaker to follow" by Stéphane Delorme in the French film journal Cahiers du Cinéma. In theatre, he has worked with Krystian Lupa and Elizabeth LeCompte and has been a longtime member of The Wooster Group.

Background
Bzymek was born in Warsaw, Poland and spent his early childhood with his family in Poland and later in Lund, Sweden. When he was eight years old, his family moved to Connecticut, after a two-year separation caused by Martial law in Poland. He lived with his family in Storrs, Connecticut, until he attended Bowdoin College in Brunswick, Maine, from which he graduated cum laude, with a major in English and a minor in Russian. He received a Master's Degree from the Polish National Film School in Łódź, Poland in 2008.

Works
In 2001, he moved back to Poland to attend The National Film School in Łódź. While in Poland, he collaborated with Krystian Lupa creating original video projections and designs for seven major theatrical productions directed by Lupa. His dream sequence projections for Lupa's Zaratustra were shot on 35mm film and first projected on the stone back wall of the outdoor amphitheater Theatre of Herodes Atticus. Since 2006, Bzymek has been a member of The Wooster Group,  a company of artists who make work for theater, dance, and media based in New York City. In 2008, Bzymek's diploma film Suddenly Forever (2008) received the grand prix du jury at Rencontres Internationales Henri Langlois (The Poitiers Film Festival) as well as two other Polish film prizes. Since 2010, Bzymek has been the main videographer and contributor to The Wooster Group's video journal The Dailies. In 2011, Bzymek finished his debut feature film Utopians, which premiered at The 61st Berlin International Film Festival.  The Dailies led him to collaborate on two experimental documentary short films with playwright Young Jean Lee, the first of which, entitled Here Come The Girls, screened at Locarno International Film Festival and The Sundance Film Festival. In 2014, Bzymek directed the music video for debuting artist Mary Komasa's single City of My Dreams (Warner Music Poland) in New York City, bringing together the Berlin-based Polish expatriate artist with members of the NYC downtown dance community. In 2015, he collaborated with the Polish pop singer Brodka, on her album Clashes and directed the video for her single Horses  (2016). In 2017, he received a Fryderyk nomination for best alternative single for his work as a lyricist with Brodka on  Horses. The same year, Brodka's album "Clashes" won the Fryderyk for Best Alternative Album of the Year 2017, on which Bzymek co-wrote five songs. He has taught a course in previsualization at CUNY New York City College of Technology.

Filmography 
Bierność (2002)
In Hotel Syren (2002)
Taki Jak Ja (Just Like Me) (2003)
Nagle na zawsze (Suddenly Forever) (2008)
Utopians (2011)
Here Come The Girls  (cinematography and editing) dir. Young Jean Lee (2013)
A Meaning Full Life (cinematography) dir. Young Jean Lee (2015)
Xenophilia (2015)

Music videos
Mary Komasa, City of My Dreams (2014 Warner Music Poland)
Brodka, Horses (2016 PIAS)

Video design in theatre and opera 
Zaratustra, dir. Krystian Lupa. Premiere 2004, Athens Festival, Odeon of Herodes Atticus.
Solaris, dir. Krystian Lupa. Premiere 2005, Düsseldorfer Schauspielhaus.
Die Zauberflöte, dir. Krystian Lupa. Premiere 2005, Theater an der Wien.
Over All The Mountain Tops, dir. Krystian Lupa. Premiere 2006, Teatr Dramatyczny, Warsaw.
The Seagull, dir. Krystian Lupa. Premiere 2007, Alexandrinsky Theatre, St. Petersburg, Russia.
Oh What War, dir. Mallory Catlett. Premiere 2007, Here Art Center.
Hamlet, The Wooster Group, dir. Elizabeth LeCompte - original video elements. Premiere 2006 at Festival Grec, Barcelona. 
La Didone, The Wooster Group, dir. Elizabeth LeCompte. Premiere 2008, Brussels.

Awards and nominations
Fryderyk Award Nomination, for best single Brodka's Horses 2017; Polish Association of Music Producers.
Teddy Award Nomination, 61st Berlin International Film Festival.
Gregory Millard Fellowship in Film, New York Foundation for the Arts, 2009.
Grand Prix du jury for the film Nagle na zawsze (Suddenly Forever) (Soudain pour toujours); 31 Rencontres Henri Langlois, Poitiers, December 2008.
1st Place for the film Nagle na zawsze (Suddenly Forever);  Young Cinema Art Festival Warsaw – 2008.
2nd Place for the film Nagle na zawsze (Suddenly Forever); 6th Annual „Łodzią po Wiśle” Warsaw, 2008.

References

Polish emigrants to the United States
Film people from Warsaw
Polish film producers
1976 births
Living people
American film producers